Calvary Episcopal Church is an Episcopal church in Americus, Georgia. First organized in 1864, the current building was constructed in 1921.

A Ralph Adams Cram Church in Americus, Georgia

It was an example of a major architectural movement, summed up in a tiny historical event.  In 1917, the congregation of Calvary Episcopal Church in Americus, Georgia, moved their decaying "Carpenter Gothic" church off its site to make room for a new church by Ralph Adams Cram, who was arguably the leading ecclesiastical architect in America. 

No event could better summarize Cram's influence on American church architecture, for it was Cram himself, in his condemnation of "Carpenter Gothic" (and nineteenth-century American Gothic in general), who had succeeded in "revolutionizing the entire visual expression of American Christianity in this century." Of "Carpenter Gothic," for example, Cram had written, "the sheer savagery of these box-like wooden structures, with their toothpick pinnacles and their adventitious buttresses of seven-eights-inch board and their jigsaw ornament, find no rival in all history."

Cram forcefully argued that nineteenth-century American Gothic has resulted in nothing but sham and pretentiousness, and he considered the fifty-year period after 1930 to have been "worse than at any time or in any place recorded in history." Such a strident polemic was based on moral as well as aesthetic grounds.  According to Cram, the nineteenth-century Gothicists had been guilty of practicing "archaeology" rather than art, through the servile imitation of historical models.  Furthermore, by their use of sham materials and construction methods, they had added pretentiousness to their sins.

Cram, thus, argued for a return to the first principles of Gothic architecture whereby the artificial, derivative qualities of the previous decades could be avoided and a new organic structural integrity as well as functional responsiveness could be gained.  In short, he advised architects "to study the motives and principles of Medieval Christian architecture rather than the mouldings."

In addition, Cram, by way of Ruskin, had fully embraced the doctrine of honest structural expression which, in church buildings, became for Cram an inviolable law: "If a church is not honest - honest in its design, its construction, its decoration-it is nothing; and any added richness, if it is the richness of falsity, is only added sham."

History
The parish was established in Americus, Georgia in 1864 as the second attempt by the Episcopal Church to establish a presence in the city. In 1869, Bishop John W. Beckwith presided over the placement of the cornerstone for the first church house. In 1905, Reverend James Bolan Lawrence became rector of the parish, a position he would hold until 1947. In 1910, the church hosted the annual convention for the Episcopal Diocese of Georgia.  In March 1919, construction began on the current building, built on the same location as the original building. The architect in charge of the building's design was noted ecclesiastical architect Ralph Adams Cram. The building was completed in 1921. In 2000, major renovations were completed on the building. In 2014, the Georgia Historical Society erected a Georgia historical marker commemorating the history of the church. In 2017, the church and the nearby Lee Street Bridge were placed on the Georgia Trust for Historic Preservation's list of Places in Peril due to concerns regarding the replacement of the Lee Street Bridge with a larger bridge that could negatively affect the historicity of the area. These concerns were later satiated, as the replacement bridge was the same height as the previous bridge.

References

Bibliography

External links

Churches in Georgia (U.S. state)
Episcopal church buildings in Georgia (U.S. state)
1864 establishments in Georgia (U.S. state)
Religious buildings and structures completed in 1921
Buildings and structures in Sumter County, Georgia
Ralph Adams Cram buildings